The Twin Triggers is a 1926 American silent Western film directed by Richard Thorpe and starring Buddy Roosevelt, Nita Cavalier, and Frederick Lee.

Cast
 Buddy Roosevelt as Bud Trigger / Kenneth Trigger 
 Nita Cavalier as Gwen 
 Frederick Lee as Dan Wallace 
 Laura Lockhart as Muriel Trigger 
 Lafe McKee as Silas Trigger 
 Slim Whitaker as Kelly 
 Clyde McClary as Bugs 
 Togo Frye as The Cook 
 Hank Bell as The Law

References

Bibliography
 Munden, Kenneth White. The American Film Institute Catalog of Motion Pictures Produced in the United States, Part 1. University of California Press, 1997.

External links
 

1926 films
1926 Western (genre) films
Films directed by Richard Thorpe
1920s English-language films
American black-and-white films
Films with screenplays by Jack Townley
Silent American Western (genre) films
1920s American films